Franco Ezequiel Leys (born 18 October 1993) is an Argentine professional footballer who plays as a midfielder for America de Cali.

Career
Leys started out in the youth of local club Villa Felisa, prior to moving in 2013 to join Argentine Primera División side Colón. He made his professional debut on 2 November 2013 against Newell's Old Boys. During his first four campaigns with Colón, Leys made sixteen appearances. Leys joined Juventud Unida of Primera B Nacional in August 2017. His first appearance for Juventud came versus Flandria in the league on 17 September. Sarmiento completed the signing of Leys in June 2018. He made thirty total appearances in 2018–19, though played just once (in the Copa Argentina) in the subsequent campaign due to a serious injury.

In July 2020, Leys agreed a move to Temperley. On 4 February 2021, Leys joined Argentine Primera División club Patronato on a deal until the end of 2022.

Career statistics
.

References

External links

1993 births
Living people
Sportspeople from Santa Fe Province
Argentine footballers
Association football midfielders
Argentine Primera División players
Primera Nacional players
Club Atlético Colón footballers
Juventud Unida de Gualeguaychú players
Club Atlético Sarmiento footballers
Club Atlético Temperley footballers
Club Atlético Patronato footballers
Argentine people of Belgian descent